A gate in cytometry is a set of value limits (boundaries) that serve to isolate a specific group of cytometric events from a large set. Gates can be defined by discrimination analysis, or can simply be drawn around a given set of data points on a printout and then converted to a computer-useful form. Gates can be implemented with a physical blinder. Gates may be used either to selectively gather data or to segregate data for analysis.

Division
Gates are divided mathematically into inclusive gates and exclusive gates. Inclusive gates select data that falls within the limits set, while exclusive gates select data that falls outside the limits.

Live gate
A live gate is a term used for a process that prevents the acquisition by the computer of non-selected data from the flow cytometer.

External links
"General Flow Cytometry Glossary and Cell Cycle Analysis Terminology" The Janis V. Giorgi Flow Cytometry Laboratory, UCLA
Osborne, G. W. (2000) "Regions and Gates"  Flow Cytometry Software Workshop: 2000, page 3

Flow cytometry
Technology systems